Van Hoof is a Dutch toponymic surname. Hoof (modern Dutch hof and hoef, "homestead") may refer to any number of places with the -hof, -hoof, or -hove endings, including the town Hove in Antwerp province, near which the surname is particularly common. It could also be derived from names with a particle, like Van 't Hof ("from the homestead"). Variants include Van Hooff and Vanhoof. Notable people with the surname include:

Elke Vanhoof (born 1992), Belgian BMX bicyclist
Frederique van Hoof (born 2001), Dutch Paralympic table tennis player
Harry van Hoof (born 1943), Dutch composer, conductor and music arranger
Henk van Hoof (born 1947), Dutch politician
Jan van Hoof (1922–1944), Dutch Resistance member
Jef van Hoof (1886–1959), Belgian composer and conductor
Mary Ann Van Hoof (1909–1984), American Marian visionary
Roger van Hoof (born 1947), Belgian Surgeon General

Van Hooff
Anton van Hooff (born 1943), Dutch historian of antiquity
Jan van Hooff (1755–1816), Dutch Patriot politician and statesman
Jan van Hooff (born 1936), Dutch primatologist

See also
Van 't Hof
Van Hove

References

Dutch-language surnames
Surnames of Dutch origin
Toponymic surnames